Alan Rogers (born 31 December 1924) is an English former football manager who was Head-Coach of Persepolis F.C. between 1971 and 1974. Persepolis F.C., an Iranian football club then played in the Takht Jamshid Cup.

Rogers is the uncle of former Tranmere Rovers chairwoman Lorraine Rogers, and has held coaching positions in the Philippines, South Africa, Iran, the US, Qatar, Zambia, Libya, Uganda and Iceland.

Rogers and Frank O'Farrell arrived in Tehran on 17 January 2006 upon invitation from Persepolis F.C. Rogers now lives in a flat in Southport.

Career 
After serving as a gunner on Arctic convoys in World War II, Rogers began a football management career that spanned 16 countries. Following his first club managerial role as head of the Philippine national football team in 1962–63, Rogers moved to South Africa where he worked for FIFA. Afterwards, he made the move to the United States where he helped launch the Chicago Spurs of the National Premier Soccer League for their lone season in 1967. He would return to coach the same club in 1970, which had been relocated and renamed the Kansas City Spurs upon joining the new North American Soccer League in 1968. Rogers arrived in Iran in 1969 for the first time and coached Paykan F.C. which was an extremely prosperous club at the time and had some of the best facilities in Iran. Rogers became champions with Paykan, following which he spent some time in America. Following his return to Iran he became coach of Persepolis F.C. in 1971 and became league champions with the club on two occasions.

Achievements 
Winner: Iran Friendship Cup, March 1970 with Paykan F.C.
This tournament was league-format where Paykan won 2 games and lost 1. Results were as follow:
Paykan defeated Adana Demirspor 2–1 and FC Universitatea Craiova 1–0, lost to CSKA Moscow 3–2.
Winner: Tehran Football Championship 1969–1970 with Paykan F.C.
Winner: Takht Jamshid League with Persepolis F.C.

Orders
 Arctic Star: 2013

References

English football managers
English expatriate football managers
Expatriate football managers in Iran
Expatriate football managers in Qatar
1924 births
Living people
Philippines national football team managers
Persepolis F.C. managers
North American Soccer League (1968–1984) coaches
Paykan F.C. managers
English expatriate sportspeople in the Philippines
English expatriate sportspeople in South Africa
English expatriate sportspeople in Iran
English expatriate sportspeople in the United States
English expatriate sportspeople in Qatar
English expatriate sportspeople in Zambia
English expatriate sportspeople in Libya
English expatriate sportspeople in Uganda
English expatriate sportspeople in Iceland
Expatriate football managers in Uganda
Expatriate football managers in Zambia
Expatriate football managers in the Philippines
Expatriate football managers in Libya
Expatriate soccer managers in the United States
Expatriate soccer managers in South Africa
Expatriate football managers in Iceland
Uganda national football team managers
Lesotho national football team managers
English expatriate sportspeople in Lesotho
Expatriate football managers in Lesotho
Royal Navy personnel of World War II
Royal Navy sailors